The Doon School is a boys-only academically selective boarding school in Dehradun, Uttarakhand, India, founded in 1935 by Satish Ranjan Das The school's first headmaster was Arthur E. Foot, who had spent some nine years as a science master at Eton College, England. The old boys of Doon are known as Doscos, and the alumni body is represented by The Doon School Old Boys' Society. Admission to the school is based on a competitive entrance examination and an interview.

Doon remains a boys-only school despite continued pressure from political leaders to become coeducational. However, girls are admitted in case they are daughters of the school staff (see entries for sculptor Latika Katt and actor Himani Shivpuri).  Although the total number of Doscos is relatively small (estimated at 5,000 since the school was founded in 1935), they include some of India's prominent politicians, artists, writers, social activists and businesspeople.

Abbreviations used in the following tables

DNG – Did not graduate
? – Class year unknown

Note: The sub-headings are given as a general guide and some names might fit under more than one category

Government

Prime Minister

Cabinet Ministers

Chief Ministers

Members of Parliament and Legislative Assemblies

Diplomats and Bureaucrats

Communist Activist

Law

Armed forces

Business

Journalism

Literature

Non-Fiction

Fiction, Poetry and Drama

Education

Arts

Fine Arts

Design

Films

Television

Music

Culinary

Sports

Titular Princes

Sources 

The class years of the alumni are sourced principally from the following:
 The Dosco Record is a book of short biographies, similar to what may be found in a Who's Who, which was first produced by J.A.K. Martyn who deliberately modeled it on the Harrow Record.  (Martyn had been a schoolmaster at Harrow School before helping A.E. Foot start The Doon School.)  As a consequence, alumni are listed in the year in which they joined Doon, rather than the year in which they graduated; Martyn believed that this would make it easier for Doscos to look up their friends.  The book is updated every 8 years or so, and is published by the Doon School Old Boys Society ("DSOBS") and distributed only to alumni.  It includes biographical information about every Dosco (even people like Sanjay Gandhi who was expelled before completing his studies); it also highlights family connections between Doscos such as whether a particular Dosco was the son of another Dosco, or married the sister or daughter of another Dosco.
 The Rose Bowl is a periodic newsletter that contains alumni news, obituaries, reminiscences, etc.  It is produced by the DSOBS and distributed by post to all alumni; a PDF version is also sent by email to alumni.
 The Doon School Register is published, every few years, by the DSOBS.  It includes the contact details of every Dosco; deceased alumni are noted as such.  Also included are the small number of "Associate Members" (honorary members) of The Doon School Old Boys: for the most part these include former teachers; also included are people such as Salim Ali who had been frequent visitors to Doon and were considered to be part of the Dosco fraternity.
 Doon, The Story of a School, edited by Sumer Singh, published by the Indian Public Schools Society 1985.  This (somewhat slim) book was distributed to alumni and contains essays, reminiscences, and stories about the founding of the Doon School.
 The Doon School -- Sixty Years On, edited by Pushpinder Singh Chopra, published by the DSOBS in October 1996.  This book is similar in many respects to Doon: The Story of a School, but longer.

References

External links 

 
 Website of The Doon School Old Boys' Society

The Doon School
Lists of Indian people by school affiliation